Boyle Point Provincial Park and Protected Area is a provincial park in British Columbia, Canada, located on the south end of Denman Island in the western Gulf of Georgia.

References

External links

Provincial Parks of the Gulf Islands
Provincial parks of British Columbia
1989 establishments in British Columbia